Rodovia Raposo Tavares (official designation SP-270) is the longest highway in the state of São Paulo, Brazil, with 654 km.

The highway starts in the city of São Paulo and continues westward, serving the main cities of Cotia, Vargem Grande Paulista, São Roque, Sorocaba, Itapetininga, Angatuba, Ourinhos, Assis, Presidente Prudente, Presidente Bernardes, Presidente Venceslau and Presidente Epitácio, at the shores of the Paraná River, by the border with Mato Grosso do Sul. It receives the Castelo Branco Highway at Ourinhos.
The highway was named in honour of António Raposo Tavares, one of the leading bandeirantes (explorers of the backlands in the 16th and 17th centuries). It is managed and maintained in its first 120 km by a state concession to private company ViaOeste, and this section requires a toll. The remainder of the highway is maintained by the State of São Paulo's Department of Roads (DER).

See also
 Highway system of São Paulo
 Brazilian Highway System

Highways in São Paulo (state)